David Davalos (born 1965) is an American playwright.

Works
2001 - Darkfall - a modern sequel to Paradise Lost. World Premiere at Sacred Fools Theater Company in Los Angeles.
2002 - Daedalus - a fantasia of Leonardo da Vinci's time as a military engineer to Cesare Borgia, in the company of Lucrezia Borgia and Niccolò Machiavelli
2008 - Wittenberg - a "tragical-comical-historical" prequel to Hamlet, Doctor Faustus (play) and the Protestant Reformation

External links

http://www.daviddavalos.com/
http://www.doollee.com/PlaywrightsD/davalos-david.html
http://www.dramatists.com/cgi-bin/db/single.asp?key=4186
http://oberonbooks.com/wittenberg.html 

Living people
20th-century American dramatists and playwrights
1965 births